William Busetti (born 25 March 1999) known professionally as Will or Will Buse is an Italian singer-songwriter.

Biography 
Busetti was born in Vittorio Veneto, and then grew up in Treviso. He began his career in 2019, when he started posting his first songs on YouTube. On 14 February 2020, he independently released his debut single "Rosso", which was followed by the singles "Prima sera" and "Fiori nel deserto".

In 2020, he took part in the fourteenth edition of the Italian talent show X Factor, entering the Boys 16-24 category, under the guidance of mentor Emma Marrone. Despite being eliminated during Bootcamp, the single "Estate", previously performed during the auditions, is subsequently certified platinum for more than 100 000 units sold in Italy.

On 10 June 2022, after signing a record deal with Capitol Records, Busetti released his debut EP Chi sono veramente, from which the single "Più forte di me" was extracted.

Will manage to qualify in the top six, with his entry "Le cose più importanti", by rightfully accessing the festival in the  category. "Stupido" was later announced as his entry for the Sanremo Music Festival 2023.

Discography

Albums

Extended plays

Singles

As featured artist

Television 
 X Factor (Sky Uno, 2020) Contestant
 Sanremo Giovani 2022 (Rai 1, 2022) Contestant - Finalist

References 

Italian pop musicians
Italian singer-songwriters
1999 births
Living people
People from Vittorio Veneto